Wilhelm Sold (19 April 1911 – 1 September 1995) was a German international footballer.

International career 
Sold won 12 caps for Germany between 1935 and 1942. He was part of Germany's squad at the 1936 Summer Olympics, but he did not play in any matches.

References

External links
 
 
 

1911 births
1995 deaths
Association football defenders
German footballers
Germany international footballers
1. FC Saarbrücken players
1. FC Nürnberg players
Tennis Borussia Berlin players
German football managers
Footballers from Saarland